Platanar Volcano is located in the Cordillera Central mountain range. It is located within the Juan Castro Blanco National Park.

Physical aspects  

It has a destroyed crater to the northwest. Prehistoric lava flows on its western flank; one of them, the so-called Florida flow, was perhaps created by Platanar's most recent activity. Cerro Porvenir has a truncated caldera at the summit with a cone inside. Both of these are part of a composed stratovolcano of Upper Pleistocene age that on Platanar's side overlies the remains of Palmera's collapsed caldera, of probable late Pleistocene age. Platanar has erupted lavas ranging from basalts to andesites in composition.

Social and economic activities  

The western flanks of both volcanoes are used for dairy farming. In 1968  on Cerro Platanar were converted into a National Forest.

Recent activity

On 30 March 1997 there were six earthquakes on the south flank, the strongest being of magnitude 2.7. A previous seismic swarm in April 1980 had lasted for 2–3 weeks.

References

Stratovolcanoes of Costa Rica
Mountains of Costa Rica
Pleistocene stratovolcanoes